Claudio Cherubini (born 29 April 1960) is a former Italian long jumper.

Career
Two-time national champion at senior level in long jump in 1984 and 1985, and indoor in 1986.

Achievements

References

External links
 

1960 births
Living people
Italian male long jumpers
Sportspeople from Rome